Acrocercops acanthidias is a moth of the family Gracillariidae, known from Java, Indonesia. The host plants for the species include Erioglossum edule and Lepisanthes rubiginosum.

References

acanthidias
Moths of Asia
Moths described in 1934